The shangjuan, or Ichang lemon (Citrus cavaleriei × C. maxima), is a cold-hardy citrus fruit and plant originating in East Asia.

Citrus hybrids
Fruits originating in East Asia